John Stephen Kós  (born 23 January 1959) is a New Zealand judge on the Supreme Court of New Zealand and the former President of the Court of Appeal of New Zealand.

Early life and career
The son of a Hungarian refugee, Kós was born in Mosgiel, Otago, in 1959 and raised in Wainuiomata. He matriculated at the Victoria University of Wellington to study law in 1976 where he later graduated LLB(Hons) in 1981. Kós attended Naenae College.

After graduating from University of Cambridge in 1985 with an LLM, Kós began a career in commercial litigation. In 1985, he became a partner in Perry Wylie & Page, and later a partner in Russell McVeagh in 1988. He went to the independent bar in 2005 and was appointed as a Queen's Counsel in 2007. He founded Stout Street Chambers, a leading set of barristers, in 2007 with three other QCs.

He is an Honorary Fellow at the Victoria University Law School. He was formerly Pro-Chancellor of Massey University.

Judicial career
In April 2011, Kós was appointed to the High Court of New Zealand. He was elevated to the Court of Appeal in September 2015, and succeeding Ellen France as President of the court in July 2016.

As President, he focused on revising the rules of the Court and reforming its processes, introducing a policy to encourage junior counsel to address the Court, and creating three-week sessions of the Permanent Court, followed by two-week circuits by Divisional Courts (with writing time for other judges).  He established regular divisional sittings in Christchurch and Dunedin and more Permanent Court sittings on cases of public interest in Auckland. He also led the project to establish a branch of the Court in the heritage precinct at the Auckland High Court, which opened in 2020. 

On 8 April 2022, it was announced that Kós would be appointed a judge to the Supreme Court of New Zealand.

Notable cases  
Justice Kós wrote the judgments in a number of notable cases: in criminal law he wrote the guideline judgment on serious drug offence sentencing (Zhang v R), on mental health deficits as a mitigating factor in sentencing generally (Orchard v R) and judgments in appeals concerning the manslaughter of 3 year-old Moko Rangitoheriri (Shailer v R) and the murder of British backpacker Grace Millane (Kempson v R), in civil and public law he has written leading judgments on fiduciary duties and economic duress (Dold v Murphy) the doctrine of penalties (Wilaci Pty Ltd v Torchlight Fund, 127 Hobson Street Ltd v Honey Bees Preschool Ltd), defamation (Hagaman v Little, Craig v MacGregor) and prospective costs and Beddoe orders in trusts cases (Woodward v Smith, McCallum v McCallum), a judgment in which Kos sought to rein in background evidence admissible in a contract interpretation case did not survive further appeal to the Supreme Court (Bathurst Resources Ltd v L&M Coal Holdings Ltd).

Extra-judicial writing  
Justice Kós has written in three particular areas:

Civil remedies
As co-author of Butler's Equity and Trusts in New Zealand and Blanchard's Civil Remedies in New Zealand.

Civil and criminal justice reform
In 2016 he advocated a civil law inquisitorial approach for unrepresented litigants, to improve access to justice. In 2018 he gave a speech to Victim Support advocating new approaches to sentencing and corrections, in particular changes to home detention and prison sentencing.

Legal history
Kós has written extensively on connections between legal and political history – on New Zealand's nuclear treaty cases in the International Court of Justice, constitutional law (and the case of Fitzgerald v Muldoon) and on appellate history.

References

Living people
High Court of New Zealand judges
Court of Appeal of New Zealand judges
20th-century New Zealand lawyers
Alumni of the University of Cambridge
New Zealand people of Hungarian descent
Victoria University of Wellington alumni
1959 births
21st-century New Zealand judges